John Evelyn the younger (1655–1699) was an English translator.

Life
Evelyn was the third but eldest surviving son of John Evelyn, born 19 January 1655. On 13 December 1660 his father presented him to the queen mother, who made much of him. Until 1662 he was 'brought up amongst Mr. Howard's children at Arundel House.’ In 1665 Edmund Bohun became his tutor. Early in 1667, he was sent still young to Trinity College, Oxford, under Ralph Bathurst.

He left Oxford in March 1669, and was admitted of the Middle Temple 2 May 1672. On 29 March 1673 his father took him to see Peter Gunning, bishop of Chichester, who gave him instruction and advice 'before he received the Holy Sacrament.' On 25 May of the same year he became a younger brother of Trinity House, and on 10 November 1675 he went to France in the suite of the ambassador Lord Berkeley, returning in May of the next year.

In December 1687 Evelyn was employed in Devon by the treasury, as a commissioner respecting 'concealment of land.' Just a year later he was presented to William, Prince of Orange at Abingdon by Colonel Sidney and Colonel Berkeley. As a volunteer in John Lovelace, 3rd Baron Lovelace's troop he helped to secure Oxford for William.

In 1690 he purchased the chief clerkship of the treasury, but was removed within a year. He acted as a commissioner of revenue in Ireland from 1692 to 1696. He returned home seriously ill, and died in Berkeley Street, London, 24 March 1699, in his father's lifetime.

Works
Evelyn translated the following works:
 'Of Gardens. Four books. First written in Latin verse by Renatus Rapinus, and now made English,’ London, 1673, dedicated to Henry Bennet, 1st Earl of Arlington.
 'The History of the Grand Visiers,’ London, 1677, from the French of François de Chassepol.
 Plutarch's 'Life of Alexander the Great,’ for the 'Plutarch's Lives by Several Hands' (1683–6).

To the third edition of his father's Sylva (1678) Evelyn contributed some prefatory Greek hexameters, written at the age of fifteen; and in the last chapter the second book of his version of René Rapin's Hortorum Liber was reprinted. Several poems by him are printed in John Dryden's 'Miscellanies' and in John Nichols's 'Collection of Poems.'

Family
Evelyn married, in 1679, Martha, daughter and coheiress of Richard Spenser, a Turkey merchant. She died 13 September 1726. By her he had two sons and three daughters, but only a son, John, and a daughter, Elizabeth (wife of Simon Harcourt, son of Simon Harcourt, 1st Viscount Harcourt), survived infancy.

The son John, born 1 March 1682, married, 18 September 1750, Anne, daughter of Edward Boscawen of Cornwall, was made a baronet 30 July 1713, built a library at the family seat of Wotton House, was a fellow of the Royal Society, and commissioner of customs, and died 18 July 1763. His grandson Sir Frederick Evelyn, a soldier, died without issue in 1812, and his estates fell to his widow, Mary, daughter of William Turton of Staffordshire, who bequeathed them on her death in 1817 to John Evelyn, a direct descendant of George Evelyn (1530–1603), and grandfather of William John Evelyn. Sir John, a first cousin of Sir Frederick, was fourth baronet, and with the death of this Sir John's brother Hugh, in 1848, the baronetcy became extinct.

Notes

References
 This source cites:
Evelyn's Diary, ed. Bray and Wheatley, i. lxxxvii, and ii. passim;
Dews's Hist. of Deptford; 
Wood's Athenæ Oxon. ed. Bliss, iv. 689.

1655 births
1699 deaths
17th-century English writers
17th-century English male writers
English translators
Fellows of the Royal Society
Alumni of Trinity College, Oxford
English male non-fiction writers
Members of Trinity House